Jon Irabagon is a Filipino-American saxophonist, composer, and founder of Irabbagast Records.

Winner of the 2008 Thelonious Monk Jazz Competition and one of Time Out'''s "25 essential New York City jazz icons", Irabagon is known for the breadth of his work on a jazz continuum ranging "from postbop to free improvisation, avant country to doom metal". His "extraordinary eclecticism" has led to performances with such diverse artists as Wynton Marsalis, Lou Reed, Evan Parker, Billy Joel, the Maria Schneider Orchestra, Bertha Hope, Herbie Hancock, Conor Oberst, Christian McBride, Mike Pride, Kenny Barron, Darcy James Argue's Secret Society, Bill Laswell, Peter Evans, Tyshawn Sorey, Ingrid Laubrock, Ava Mendoza, Mick Barr, and Tom Rainey.

Irabagon's many projects as bandleader include a quartet with Luis Perdomo, Yasushi Nakamura, and Rudy Royston, as well as a trio with Mark Helias and Barry Altschul. He is also a member of the Mary Halvorson Quintet, Septet, and Octet; the Dave Douglas Quintet; Barry Altschul’s 3Dom Factor; and is a former member of Mostly Other People Do the Killing. Irabagon received a Philippine Presidential Award in 2014.

Education and career

Irabagon grew up in Chicago’s northern suburbs before attending DePaul, where he completed his BM in Music Business in 2000. In 2001, Irabagon moved to New York City and enrolled in a master's degree at Manhattan School of Music; after completing his MA, he went on to study in the jazz program at Juilliard.

In 2003, Irabagon joined Peter Evans and Kevin Shea in Moppa Elliott's Mostly Other People Do the Killing, a quartet known for both technical skill and a "prankish exterior"; their first album was released on Elliott's Hot Cup Records in 2005. Irabagon went on to record eleven albums with the group, including their controversial note-for-note remake of Miles Davis's Kind of Blue.

In 2008, Innova released Irabagon's first album as leader, Jon Irabagon’s Outright!. The record's core quintet includes trumpeter Russ Johnson, pianist Kris Davis, bassist Eivind Opsvik, and drummer Jeff Davis, all of whom also provide vocals on a track with the 14-member Outright! Mixed Choir; another track, "Outright! Theme", features a 30-member jazz band.

Later that year, Irabagon was announced winner of the 2008 Thelonious Monk Jazz Competition by judges Wayne Shorter, Jimmy Heath, Greg Osby, Jane Ira Bloom, and David Sánchez. The award included a cash prize, some of which went toward studies with Roscoe Mitchell, and a contract with Concord Records, the label that released Irabagon's The Observer in 2009. In the first of several dual-disparate-release years, the more conservative album was preceded by I Don't Hear Nothin' But The Blues, a one-track, metal-tinged improvisation with drummer Mike Pride.

In 2010, Firehouse 12 Records released the Mary Halvorson Quintet's Saturn Sings, the first of four releases Irabagon recorded with the composer and guitarist; following the quintet's second album, they appeared on NPR Music's Tiny Desk Concerts. Halvorson and Irabagon continued performing together in various arrangements, and Irabagon appeared on her septet and octet releases.The New York City Jazz Record named Irabagon a "Musician of the Year" after an extremely active 2012: Irabagon was featured on the acclaimed Be Still, the first of four albums he recorded with the Dave Douglas Quintet, as well as on the Mary Halvorson Quintet's highly lauded Bending Bridges. He officially launched Irabbagast Records, in part because he doubted that his more "extreme" projects would be considered marketable to other labels. He marked Irabbagast's debut with two releases as bandleader: I Don't Hear Nothin' But The Blues Volume 2: Appalachian Haze, a trio with Mick Barr and Mike Pride; and Outright! Unhinged, his quintet with Ralph Alessi, Jacob Sacks, John Hébert, and Tom Rainey. He was also awarded the National Association of Filipino-Americans' Mabuhay Award.

In 2015, Irabagon again released two albums as leader: Behind the Sky was recorded with his quartet of Luis Perdomo, Yasushi Nakamura, and Rudy Royston, joined by guest Tom Harrell; Inaction is An Action is an experimental solo sopranino saxophone record employing extensive use of extended techniques.

In the 2019 DownBeat'' International Critics Poll, Irabagon was included in the "Rising Star" listings for tenor saxophone, alto saxophone, and jazz artist.

Discography

As leader

As co-leader

As sideperson (selected)

References 

Living people
21st-century American saxophonists
American jazz saxophonists
American jazz composers
American musicians of Filipino descent
Year of birth missing (living people)
Avant-garde jazz saxophonists
American experimental musicians
Avant-garde jazz musicians
21st-century American composers
21st-century jazz composers